Stewart–Lee House, also known as the Norman Stewart House, is a historic home located in Richmond, Virginia.  It was built in 1844, and is a three-story, three bay, Greek Revival style brick townhouse.  Its low hipped roof is pierced by four interior end chimneys and surrounded by a simple molded cornice with a plain frieze.  In 1864, Robert E. Lee's wife and daughter occupied the house after the confiscation of "Arlington." On April 15, 1865, General Lee retired to the home following the surrender at Appomattox.  He resided there only until June 1865, due to the "result of constant callers." In 1893, the building was given to the Virginia Historical Society "for the use and occupation of the Virginia Historical Society as a library and assembly rooms"; they occupied it until 1959.  The house was conveyed to the Confederate Memorial Literary Society in 1961 and is currently the used as the office of The Family Foundation.

It was listed on the National Register of Historic Places in 1972.

References

External links 
Norman Stewart House, 707 East Franklin Street, Richmond, Independent City, VA: 1 photo at Historic American Buildings Survey

Historic American Buildings Survey in Virginia
Houses on the National Register of Historic Places in Virginia
Greek Revival houses in Virginia
Houses completed in 1844
Houses in Richmond, Virginia
National Register of Historic Places in Richmond, Virginia